Enekbatus cristatus is a shrub endemic to Western Australia.

Description
It is found on sloping sand plains in the Mid West region of Western Australia around Northampton where it grows in sandy-gravelly soils over sandstone.

References

cristatus
Endemic flora of Western Australia
Myrtales of Australia
Rosids of Western Australia
Vulnerable flora of Australia
Plants described in 2010
Taxa named by Barbara Lynette Rye
Taxa named by Malcolm Eric Trudgen